María Luisa Mira Franco (born 1944), better known as Magüi Mira, is a Spanish actress and theatre director. In addition to her stage credits, she has also performed in film and television works.

Biography 
María Luisa Mira Franco was born in 1944 in Valencia. Her younger brother  was a filmmaker. She studied medieval history in Valencia. In 1967, she moved together with her first husband José Sanchis Sinisterra to Teruel. She moved to Barcelona in 1971, graduating in performing arts from the Institut del Teatre. After a long acting career in theatre, she made her directorial debut with Top Girls, followed by a staging of The Dog in the Manger in 2002.

In 2016, she was recognised with the Gold Medal of Merit in the Fine Arts.

She is the mother of actress .

References 

1944 births
Living people
Spanish stage actresses
Spanish television actresses
Spanish film actresses
20th-century Spanish actresses
21st-century Spanish actresses
People from Valencia
Spanish theatre directors
Actresses from the Valencian Community